The American Modern Ensemble is a contemporary classical music ensemble based in the United States in New York City with the goal of premiering, performing and recording and commissioning the widest possible repertoire written by American composers. The group's focus is to celebrate and showcase American music and especially works written by living composers. AME is also dedicated to education and outreach programs that expose communities to American music, and particularly to new music written by living composers. AME was founded in 2005 by American composer Robert Paterson, who serves as the ensemble's Artistic Director, and his wife, Victoria Paterson, a violinist, who also serves as the ensemble's Executive Director.

Instrumentation
Instrumentation for each concert is repertoire/instrumentation-based and is drawn from a sinfonietta-sized group: flute (doubling alto flute and piccolo), clarinet (doubling bass clarinet and E-flat clarinet), oboe (doubling English horn), bassoon (doubling contrabassoon), horn, trumpet (C trumpet, B-flat trumpet and piccolo trumpets in E-flat and D), trombone, percussion, piano (doubling synthesizer), two violins, viola, violoncello, bass.

Programmed composers
Incomplete list of composers whose works have been programmed by the American Modern Ensemble through the 2014-15 season:

Artists
Performer Members of AME as of the 2015-16 Season:

†Denotes current core member.

AME Composition Competition
Since 2006, AME has held an annual composition competition for American composers (North, Central and South America). Through 2011, this competition was for composers ages 18–35. Starting in 2012, awards are now given in three categories: Tier I (Young Artist), ages 22 and under; Tier II (Emerging), ages 18–35, and Tier III (Professional), all ages. Former winners from 2011 and past are now considered Tier II winners. Winners receive cash awards, archival recordings and performances of either their winning work or another work.

2014 Ninth Annual Competition

Tier III
 Winner: John Fitz Rogers - Sehnen
 Honorable Mention: Max Grafe - Kheir
 Honorable Mention: Nicholas Omiccioli - push/pull
 Honorable Mention: Wayne Oquin - In Dreams Awake
Tier II
 Winner: Gabriella Smith - Brandenburg Interstices
 Honorable Mention: Michael Gilbertson - who remembers day
 Honorable Mention: Carolina Heredia - Lus in Bello
 Honorable Mention: Alexander Miller - Echoes in the Dark
Tier I
 Winner: Vincent Gover - Brook’s Release
 Honorable Mention: Ryan Lindveit - Short Stories

2013 Eighth Annual Competition

Tier III
 Winner: Carl Schimmel - Roadshow for Otto
 Honorable Mention: Nicolas Scherzinger - Fractured Mirrors
 Honorable Mention: Roger Zare - Fractal Miniatures
Tier II
 Winner: Nicholas Omiccioli - Flourishes
 Honorable Mention: Paul Frucht - Echo in Roger’s Park
 Honorable Mention: Takuma Itoh - Undercurrent
Tier I
 Winner: Katherine Balch - Triple Point
 Honorable Mention: Molly Joyce - Parade
 Honorable Mention: Brendan McMullen - Seven Cicadas

2012 Seventh Annual Competition

Tier III
 Winner: Alejandro Rutty - Black Box Bossa
 Honorable Mention: John Liberatore - Lennon Scatters and Fleeces His Flock
Tier II
 Winner: Lembit Beecher - Frantic Gnarly Still
 Honorable Mention: Piotr Szewczyk - Nimbus
Tier I
 Winner: Hillary Purrington - Fixed Mediums
 Honorable Mention: Loren Loiacono - Waking Rhythm

Past Winners
 2011: Eric Nathan
 2010: Christopher Chandler
 2009: Spencer Topel
 2008: Derrick Wang
 2007: Sean McClowry
 2006: Karim Al-Zand

References

External links
 Official Website
 American Modern Ensemble Facebook page
 American Modern Ensemble MySpace page
 American Modern Ensemble Twitter page
 American Modern Ensemble YouTube page

Contemporary classical music ensembles
Orchestras based in New York City
Organizations based in New York City
Arts organizations based in New York City
Culture of New York City
Musical groups established in 2005
2005 establishments in New York City